Merchant's Cafe is a restaurant in Seattle, in the U.S. state of Washington. Located at the corner of James and Yesler since 1890, the reportedly haunted restaurant bills itself as the city's oldest.

See also 
 List of reportedly haunted locations in the United States
 List of restaurants in Seattle

References

External links
 
 

Reportedly haunted locations in Washington (state)
Restaurants in Seattle